XHSU-FM/XESU-AM is a combo radio station in Mexicali. Broadcasting on 105.9 FM and 790 AM, XHSU/XESU is owned by Radiorama and is known as La Dinámica.

History
XESU received its concession on August 31, 1957, originally owned by Ignacio Cárdenas Galvez. In the 1960s, it was sold to Luis Blando López.

The FM station was among the first wave of 80 AM-FM combos authorized, in 1994.

References

Radio stations in Mexicali